iCEDQ is a data testing and observability platform developed for identifying data issues in the test, release, and monitoring phase of the DataOps lifecycle.

Background 
iCEDQ was developed by the Connecticut based software company, Torana in 2005, and was designed by Sandesh Gawande.

Recognition 
iCEDQ was awarded the best-rising star and premium usability awards by Finance Online. In 2019, iCEDQ received the best value software award by Software Suggest.

References 

Internet properties established in 2005
Website monitoring software
Software companies established in 2005